Dingle Reservoir is an artificial, low alkalinity, shallow reservoir near to the town of Egerton, Greater Manchester. The reservoir itself is a little under 400 metres from the border between Lancashire and Greater Manchester, being found on the Lancashire side.

References 

Buildings and structures in Blackburn with Darwen
Drinking water reservoirs in England
Reservoirs in Lancashire